Kreuzstraße station is a railway station in the Kreuzstraße district of the municipality of Valley, located in the Miesbach district in Upper Bavaria, Germany.

References

External links

Munich S-Bahn stations
Railway stations in Bavaria
Railway stations in Germany opened in 1912
1912 establishments in Bavaria
Buildings and structures in Miesbach (district)